Platynota zapatana is a species of moth   of the family Tortricidae. It is found in the southern United States (Arizona, New Mexico and Texas) and Mexico (Coahuila, Nuevo Leon, San Luis Potosi and Tamaulipas).

References

Moths described in 2012
Platynota (moth)